Constantino Brumidi (July 26, 1805 – February 19, 1880) was a Greek-Italian-American historical painter, best known and honored for his fresco work, Apotheosis of Washington, in the Capitol Building in Washington, DC.

Parentage and early life
Brumidi was born in Rome, his father a Greek from Filiatra in the province of Messinia, Greece, and his mother an Italian. He showed his talent for fresco painting at an early age and painted in several Roman palaces, among them being that of Prince Torlonia. Under Gregory XVI he worked for three years in the Vatican.

Immigration and following work

The occupation of Rome by French forces in 1849 apparently persuaded Brumidi to emigrate, having joined the short-lived risorgimental Roman Republic, and he sailed for the United States, where he became a naturalized citizen in 1852. Taking up his residence in New York City, the artist painted a number of portraits.

In 1854 Brumidi went to Mexico, where he painted an allegorical representation of the Holy Trinity for the altarpiece of the Mexico City Metropolitan Cathedral. Brumidi subsequently created several works for St. Stephen's Church in New York, including an altarpiece (1855) and murals (1866 and 1871–72).

Brumidi first visited the United States Capitol in the 1850s, after being introduced to Quartermaster General Montgomery C. Meigs, who was overseeing the completion of the Capitol dome and rotunda.

Brumidi also executed frescoes at Taylor's Chapel, Baltimore, Maryland.

His first art work in the Capitol Building was in the meeting room of the House Committee on Agriculture. At first he received eight dollars a day, which Jefferson Davis, then Secretary of War of the United States, helped increase to ten dollars.  His work attracting much favorable attention, he was given further commissions, and gradually settled into the position of a Government painter. His chief work in Washington was done in the rotunda of the Capitol and included The Apotheosis of Washington in the dome and the Frieze of American History, which contains allegorical scenes from American history. His work in the rotunda was left unfinished at his death, but he had decorated many other sections of the building, most notably hallways in the Senate side of the Capitol now known as the Brumidi Corridors.

Brumidi's Liberty and Union paintings are mounted near the ceiling of the White House entrance hall.

In the Cathedral-Basilica of Sts. Peter and Paul in Philadelphia, Pennsylvania, he pictured St. Peter and St. Paul. Brumidi was a capable, if conventional painter, and his black and white modeling in the work at Washington, in imitation of bas-relief, is strikingly effective.  He decorated the entrance hall of Saleaudo, located at Frederick, Maryland, and listed on the National Register of Historic Places in 1979.

A Brumidi fresco appears behind the altar in St. Ignatius Church in Baltimore, Maryland. Another, of Saint Aloysius Gonzaga receiving communion from Saint Charles Borromeo, hangs over the high altar of St Aloysius Church in Washington, D.C.Another Brumidi altarpiece was recently restored behind the marble high altar of the Shrine and Parish Church of the Holy Innocents in New York, New York. The fresco commissioned by the first pastor of Holy Innocents Fr. John Larkin, portrays the Crucifixion of Jesus.

In memoriam
Brumidi died in Washington, D.C., and was interred at Glenwood Cemetery. When he was buried, his grave was unmarked. The location of Brumidi's grave was lost for 72 years. It was rediscovered, and on February 19, 1952, a marker was finally placed above it.

Forgotten for many years, Brumidi's role was rescued from obscurity by Myrtle Cheney Murdock.

On June 10, 2008, Congress passed, and on September 1, 2008, President George W. Bush signed, Public Law 110–59 (122 Stat. 2430), which posthumously awarded the Congressional Gold Medal to Constantino Brumidi, to be displayed in the Capitol Visitor Center, as part of an exhibit honoring him.

Gallery

See also

 Allyn Cox, a later United States Capitol muralist

References

Broumidis. "EI" Magazine of European Art Center (EUARCE) 6th issue 1994, p. 13 & 39-41
https://shrineofholyinnocents.org/restoration

External links
Constantino Brumidi: Il Michelangelo Del Capitol (Italian) - Dossena, Tiziano Thomas, L'Idea Magazine N.24, Vol.II, 2005, New York
''Biography of Constantino Brumidi' (English) - Order of AHEPA History, 2020.

1805 births
1880 deaths
Brumidi, Costantino
19th-century American painters
American male painters
American people of Italian descent
American people of Greek descent
Greek painters
Italian emigrants to the United States
19th-century Italian painters
Italian male painters
19th-century painters of historical subjects
Artists of the United States Capitol
Congressional Gold Medal recipients
American muralists
Burials at Glenwood Cemetery (Washington, D.C.)
19th-century Italian male artists
19th-century Greek Americans
19th-century Greek painters
19th-century American male artists